Jérôme Bonnissel (born 16 April 1973) is a French former professional footballer who played as a left-back.

Career
Born in Montpellier, Bonnissel started his career with hometown club Montpellier, and proceeded to spend three seasons with La Liga club Deportivo de La Coruña.

He returned to his homeland to join Bordeaux in 1999 and stayed until he joined Rangers during the 2003 January transfer window, on a contract until the end of the season. The highlight of his time at Rangers was a start in the 2003 Scottish League Cup Final win over Celtic at Hampden Park.

In the summer of 2003 he joined Fulham on a free transfer, going on to play in their memorable 3–1 win over Manchester United at Old Trafford. On Boxing Day 2003 he was injured in a league game against Southampton and never played for Fulham again before leaving the club in 2005.

After a short six-month spell at Marseille, Bonnissel retired in 2006.

Career statistics

Honours
Rangers F.C.:
Scottish League Cup: 2003

References

External links
 
 
 

Living people
1973 births
Footballers from Montpellier
Association football fullbacks
French footballers
France under-21 international footballers
Ligue 1 players
Montpellier HSC players
La Liga players
Deportivo de La Coruña players
FC Girondins de Bordeaux players
Premier League players
Fulham F.C. players
Rangers F.C. players
Olympique de Marseille players
Footballers at the 1996 Summer Olympics
Olympic footballers of France
Scottish Premier League players
Expatriate footballers in Scotland
Expatriate footballers in England
Expatriate footballers in Spain
French expatriate footballers